USS O’Brien (TB-30) was a  in the United States Navy named after Captain Jeremiah O'Brien and his five brothers, Gideon, John, William, Dennis and Joseph, who captured  on June 12, 1775 during the American Revolution.

Built in Elizabeth, New Jersey 

The first ship to be so named by the Navy, O’Brien (Torpedo Boat 30) was laid down under the direct supervision of naval architect Arthur Leopold Busch at Navy Lt. Lewis Nixon's, Crescent Shipyard of Elizabethport, New Jersey, 29 December 1898; launched 24 September 1900; sponsored by Miss Mira O’Brien, great-great granddaughter of Joseph O’Brien; and commissioned 15 July 1905.

Service with the U.S. Navy 

Between August 1905 and April 1906, she operated with the coastal squadron between Newport, Rhode Island, and Pensacola, Florida.

Inactivation
Placed in the Reserve Torpedo Flotilla 7 May 1906, at the Norfolk Navy Yard, she was struck from the Navy List 3 March 1909 and used as target.

References

 
 NavSource Naval History Photographic History of the United States Navy - USS O'BRIEN (Torpedo Boat # 30, TB-30)

 

Torpedo boats of the United States Navy
Ships built in Elizabeth, New Jersey
1900 ships
Shipwrecks
Ships sunk as targets
Maritime incidents in 1909